Charles True Goodsell (born July 23, 1932) is Professor Emeritus at Virginia Tech's Center for Public Administration and Policy. He is perhaps best known for his volume The Case for Bureaucracy, now in its 4th edition.

Goodsell is a co-author of the Blacksburg Manifesto, written with Gary Wamsley, Robert Bacher, Philip Kronenberg, John Rohr, Camilla Stivers, Orion White, and James Wolf – all of whom were at Virginia Tech during the 1980s. In 1994, Goodsell was elected as a fellow of the National Academy of Public Administration.

Early life and education 
Charles T. Goodsell was born in Kalamazoo, Michigan on July 23, 1932. He is the son of former Kalamazoo College President Charles Goodsell and Francess Comee Goodsell. Goodsell earned his BA degree at Kalamazoo College in 1954. Goodsell graduated magna cum laude and was awarded the William G. Howard Memorial Prize in political science and the Oakley Prize for highest grade recorded for a college course. After graduating, Goodsell enlisted in the United States Army and served from 1954 to 1956. Goodsell then obtained his PhD at Harvard University where he was a student of V. O. Key, Jr.

Academic career 
Goodsell began his academic teaching career as an assistant professor of public administration at the University of Puerto Rico in 1961. In 1964 he became a research associate at Princeton University. Two years later in 1966, he became a professor of political science at Southern Illinois University. In 1978, Charles Goodsell began teaching at Virginia Tech University as a professor of public administration and public affairs and served as director of the university's Center for Public Administration and Policy. Goodsell continued to teach at Virginia Tech University until he retired in 2002, although he remained at the university as professor emeritus. During his career, Goodsell was also a distinguished visitor at Cleveland State University, Carleton University and the University of Texas at Austin.

Author 

In The Case for Bureaucracy: A Public Administration Polemic, Charles Goodsell takes the position that the generally disparaging view of bureaucracy is unwarranted, and that the "quality of public service in the United states is vastly underrated". Originally published in 1983, it is Goodsell's best known work. Intended to be a rebuttal to the popular notion of bureaucracy as a callous, oppressive, and dysfunctional machine, it has been the recipient of much praise within the field of public administration. Since its original release, there have been 3 subsequent editions, with the 4th edition being released in December 2003.

In Goodsell's 2011 book, Mission Mystique: Belief Systems in Public Agencies, he examines six United States public agencies, including the US National Park Service, the US National Weather Service, the Centers for Disease Control and Prevention, and the Peace Corps, among others.

In The American statehouse: Interpreting democracy's temples, Goodsell reviews all fifty United States’ capitals and their buildings. He uses three concepts to interpret government architecture in the social sense: the search for political values in the buildings, the effects of the building on behavior, and the impression the buildings make on society. Additionally, all of the photographs used in the book were taken by Goodsell.

References

Additional publications

External links 
 Curriculum Vitae (Summary) at the Center for Public Administration and Policy, Virginia Tech
 Charles Goodsell on Governing Space at 2013 Ridenour Faculty Fellowship Conference

American political scientists
Harvard University alumni
Virginia Tech faculty
Writers from Virginia
People from Blacksburg, Virginia
1932 births
Living people
Public administration scholars
Place of birth missing (living people)